An organizer box is a type of storage box featuring small compartments for sorting components like screws, nails, bolts, washers etc or for pills. The compartments can be separated by removable dividers.

Types of organizer boxes:
 Screw boxes
 Drawer storage cabinet
 Pill organizers

See also 
 Toolbox

Containers